Ramiro Gonzalez (born 23 July 1980) is an Argentinean former professional footballer who played as a goalkeeper. He works as the owner of RG Goalkeeper Gloves in his home country.

Career
Born in Argentina, Gonzalez started his senior career with Olympique de Marseille. In 2000, he signed for Airdrieonians in the Scottish Championship, where he made eight league appearances and scored zero goals. After that, he played for  Ross County, Real Ávila CF, Raith Rovers, La Plata Fútbol Club, CD Calahorra, Marino de Luanco, Alki Larnaca, Chalkanoras Idaliou, Montrose, Ethnikos Assia, and Omonia Aradippou before retiring.

References

1980 births
Living people
Argentine footballers
Association football goalkeepers
Airdrieonians F.C. (1878) players
Ross County F.C. players
Real Ávila CF players
Raith Rovers F.C. players
La Plata FC footballers
CD Calahorra players
Marino de Luanco footballers
Alki Larnaca FC players
Chalkanoras Idaliou players
Montrose F.C. players
Ethnikos Assia FC players
Omonia Aradippou players
Argentine expatriate footballers
Argentine expatriate sportspeople in Scotland
Expatriate footballers in Scotland
Argentine expatriate sportspeople in Spain
Expatriate footballers in Spain
Argentine expatriate sportspeople in Cyprus
Expatriate footballers in Cyprus